Gary Grove Koch (born January 6, 1942) is an American biostatistician who serves as professor of biostatistics and director of the Biometric Consulting Laboratory at the University of North Carolina at Chapel Hill, where he has been a faculty member since 1968. In 1972, he was elected a fellow of the American Statistical Association, and in 1974, he received the Mortimer Spiegelman Award from the American Public Health Association. In 1996, he was awarded an honorary doctorate from DeMontfort University in the United Kingdom.

References

External links
Faculty page

Living people
1942 births
People from Mount Vernon, Ohio
Ohio State University alumni
University of North Carolina at Chapel Hill alumni
University of North Carolina at Chapel Hill faculty
Fellows of the American Statistical Association